"The Light In Our Soul", an up-tempo ballad, was the second single from the album My Number One by 2005 Eurovision winner Helena Paparizou. The song was written by Costas Bigalis and was chosen for the Eurovision Greek National Final, along with "O.K." and "Let's Get Wild," but it was "My Number One" that was chosen. The song was disqualified because it was revealed that a CD demo version of the song sung by another artist had been leaked on the internet and made available for sale on the site of an e-tailer. Paparizou herself stated during a concert in Chicago Illinois that "The Light in Our Soul" was leaked on the internet, and the song was therefore disqualified from the Eurovision preselection. She then made a very jovial comment regarding internet file-sharing in general saying: "No no, I do not use the internet. This is why we don't like the internet."

Music video
In the music video for "The Light in Our Soul," Paparizou is seen in two different settings. The first is Elena singing and the second scene is Elena walking around a city lighting the city up. The video is recorded in two languages; the first was a Greeklish version which aired in Greece, while the English version aired in Sweden.

Track listing
CD single
"The Light in Our Soul" – 2:56
"The Light in Our Soul" [Greeklish Version] – 2:56
"Katse Kala (Behave Yourself)" – 4:23

Charts

References 

2005 singles
Helena Paparizou songs
MAD Video Music Award for Best Pop Video
Pop ballads
Songs written by Kostas Bigalis
English-language Greek songs
2005 songs
Sony BMG singles
Bonnier Music singles